Edige Rishatuly Niyazov (Edige Rıshatuly Nııazov; Russian: Едыге Решатович Ниязов; 22 March 1940, Alma-Ata (Almaty) — 29 November 2009, Pavlodar) was a Soviet and Kazakhstan photographer.

Biography 
Edige Niyazov was born in 1940 in Alma-Ata. He graduated from the History Department of the Kazakh State University and worked as a history teacher from 1964 to 1977. He was a member of the Photographers Union of Russia, Honorary member of the Mediterranean Photography Center «Dark Fountain» in France and member of the Kazakh's «Pryirtysh» Association.

Exhibitions 

Personal photoexhibitions:
 Almaty (2000, 2004, Kazakhstan);
 Hamburg (1999, Germany);
 Melitopol (1988, Ukraine);
 Moscow (1987, 2002, Russia);
 Omsk (2009, Ru: Museum of The Art named by M. A. Vrubel, Russia);
 Pavlodar (1998, 2004; 2010 (17.03.2010 — 17.04.2010), Ru: Exhibition0 ~180 photos, Pavlodar Oblast' Art Museum, Kazakhstan);
 Saint-Peterburg (2.07.2009 — 27.07.2009, Ru: «Direct Photography», 1983–1993 years, gallery «D-137» in the Government Russian Museum, Russia).
 Stockholm (1988, Sweden);
 Ukhta (1990, Russia);
 Aix-en-Provence (1990, 1992, France);

Also have a participation of Art of Photography Exhibition in France, USA, Finland, Sweden, Japan, Russia, Spain and so on.

Bibliography

See also 

 Ru: статья на Photographer.Ru — это профессиональный экспертный интернет-ресурс. 
 Ru: Небольшая галерея фотографий
 Ru: анонсы выставок на сайте Союза фотохудожников России (также )
 Ru: «Петербургский эпос Едыге Ниязова», авт. Андрей Хлобыстин
 Ru: «Художник светописи», газета Известия от 08 декабря 2006, авт. Зауре Ахметова
 Ru: «...трагическая смерть», газета Комсомольская правда от 01.12.2009, авт. Т. Ермашев

1940 births
2009 deaths
Kazakhstani photographers
People from Almaty